The 1972 European Weightlifting Championships were held in Constanţa, Romania from May 13 to May 21, 1972. This was the 51st edition of the event. There were 157 men in action from 27 nations.

Medal summary

Medal table
Ranking by Big (Total result) medals

References
Results (Chidlovski.net)
М. Л. Аптекарь.  «Тяжёлая атлетика. Справочник.» — М.: «Физкультура и спорт», 1983. — 416 с. 

European Weightlifting Championships
European Weightlifting Championships
European Weightlifting Championships
International weightlifting competitions hosted by Romania
Sport in Constanța